Glorifying the American Girl is a 1929 American pre-Code musical comedy film produced by Florenz Ziegfeld that highlights Ziegfeld Follies performers. The last third of the film, which was filmed in early Technicolor, is basically a Follies production, with appearances by Rudy Vallee, Helen Morgan, and Eddie Cantor.

Rex Beach was paid $35,000 for the original story.

The script for the film was written by J.P. McEvoy and Millard Webb and directed by John W. Harkrider and Millard Webb. The songs were written by Irving Berlin, Walter Donaldson, Rudolf Friml, James E. Hanley, Larry Spier and Dave Stamper. The film is in the public domain, and many prints exhibited on television are in black-and-white only, and do not include pre-Code material, such as nudity.

Plot
The plot involves a young woman (Mary Eaton) who wants to be in the Follies, but in the meantime is making ends meet by working at a department store's sheet music department, where she sings the latest hits. She is accompanied on piano by her childhood boyfriend (Edward Crandall), who is in love with her, despite her single-minded interest in her career.  When a vaudeville performer (Dan Healy) asks her to join him as his new partner, she sees it as an opportunity to make her dream come true. Upon arriving in New York City, our heroine finds out that her new partner is only interested in sleeping with her and makes this a condition of making her a star. Soon, however, she is discovered by a representative of Ziegfeld.

Cast

Mary Eaton as Gloria Hughes
Dan Healy as Danny Miller
Kaye Renard as Mooney
Edward Crandall as Buddy Moore
Gloria Shea as Barbara (billed as Olive Shea)
Sarah Edwards as Mrs. Hughes
Lou Hearn as tailor shop customer

Cameo appearances

Noah Beery
Irving Berlin
Norman Brokenshire
Billie Burke
Eddie Cantor
Desha Delteil
Charles B. Dillingham
Texas Guinan
Otto Kahn
Nancy Kelly
Ring Lardner
Bull Montana
Helen Morgan
Tony Sansone
Louis Sorin
Rudy Vallee
Jimmy Walker
Johnny Weissmuller
Joseph Urban
Florenz Ziegfeld Jr.
Adolph Zukor

Production
This Pre-Code movie is notable for being the first talkie to use the word "damn" (that credit usually goes to either Pygmalion or Gone with the Wind). The word is used twice by Sarah Edwards as well as multiple times in the skit involving Eddie Cantor, Louis Sorin and Lew Hearn.  (The word was also used twice in the film Coquette, released in April of the same year.) The revue sequence contains virtual nudity and revealing costumes. Both Paramount and EMKA failed to renew the copyright and the film is now in the public domain. EMKA's successor, Universal Studios, continues to hold the original film elements; though technically the EMKA library is part of NBC Universal Television, successor to Universal Television and MCA Television (EMKA was a subsidiary of MCA). The movie contains brief shots of Noah Beery, Irving Berlin, Billie Burke, Charles B. Dillingham, Texas Guinan, Otto Kahn, Ring Lardner, and Mayor of New York City Jimmy Walker as themselves, taken from newsreels and other productions. There is an uncredited, non-speaking scene with Johnny Weissmuller wearing nothing but a fig leaf. The greater part of the final half of the film is a revue given over to a re-creation of a Follies production, replete with musical solos by Rudy Vallee and Helen Morgan and a comedy sketch with Eddie Cantor and Louis Sorin as a pair of Jewish tailors.

Preservation 

The black-and-white prints currently shown on television, with a cut-down running time of 87 minutes, were made in the 1950s and have a number of sequences cut due to their Pre-Code content, i.e. nudity, etc. The film was restored, to the length of 96 minutes, with the original Technicolor sequences, by the UCLA Film and Television Archive. Glorifying The American Girl was released on DVD and blu-ray by Kino Lorber on December 3, 2019. This version is taken from the UCLA restoration and includes the complete film including the Technicolor sequences.

Reception 
The film was a box office flop, with low-quality sound technology and low-value stars, and with little success among retrospective critics.

Soundtrack
The film begins with a medley of hits from Ziegfeld productions, including "Tulip Time", "A Pretty Girl Is Like a Melody", "Sally, Won't You Come Back?", and "No Foolin'." The band at the picnic plays "Bye Bye Blackbird" and "Side by Side."
 "No Foolin'"
Music by Rudolf Friml and James F. Hanley
Lyrics by Gene Buck and Irving Caesar
Sung by Mary Eaton
 "Baby Face"
Music by Harry Akst
Lyrics by Benny Davis
Sung by Mary Eaton
 "I'll Be There"
Music by Larry Spier, J. Fred Coots, and Lou Davis
Sung by Mary Eaton and played on the piano several times by Edward Crandall
 "Spooning with the One You Love"
Performed by Dan Healy and Kaye Renard
 "Blue Skies"
Music by Irving Berlin
Played by a band while the acrobats are performing
 "Sam, the Old Accordion Man"
Music by Walter Donaldson
Danced to by Dan Healy and Mary Eaton at the picnic and later onstage
 "Hot Feet"
Music by Jimmy McHugh
Danced to by Dan Healy and Mary Eaton
 "I'm Just a Vagabond Lover"
Music by Rudy Vallée and Leon Zimmerman
Performed by Rudy Vallée and His Connecticut Yankees
 "What Wouldn't I Do for That Man?"
Music by Jay Gorney
Lyrics by E.Y. Harburg
Performed by Helen Morgan
 "There Must Be Somebody Waiting For Me"
Music by Walter Donaldson
Performed by Mary Eaton and chorus in the finale. Played by pianist while Eaton dances en pointe. Played during opening credits.

See also
 List of films in the public domain in the United States
 List of early color feature films
 Nudity in film

References

External links

 
 
 
  (censored version)

1929 films
1929 musical comedy films
1920s color films
American musical comedy films
1920s English-language films
Paramount Pictures films
Films directed by Millard Webb
Ziegfeld Follies
American black-and-white films
1920s American films